Mount Joy can refer to:

Canada
 Mount Joy, Ontario, a community in Canada
 Mount Joy GO Station, a station in this community

United States
 Mount Joy, New Jersey
 Mount Joy, Ohio
 Mount Joy Township, Adams County, Pennsylvania
 Mount Joy Township, Lancaster County, Pennsylvania
 Mount Joy, Pennsylvania, a borough of Lancaster County
 Mount Joy (Amtrak station), a station in this borough
 Mount Joy (Whitemarsh, Pennsylvania), a historic house in Montgomery County
 Mount Joy, an unincorporated community in Scott County, Iowa
 Mount Joy, a small mountain in Valley Forge National Historical Park

United Kingdom
 A small hill in Durham City, UK

Other uses
 Mt. Joy (band)

See also 
 Mountjoy (disambiguation)